Statistics of 1. deild in the 1995 season.

Overview
It was contested by 10 teams, and GÍ Gøta won the championship.

League standings

Results
The schedule consisted of a total of 18 games. Each team played two games against every opponent in no particular order. One of the games was at home and one was away.

Top goalscorers
Source: faroesoccer.com

24 goals
 Súni Fríði Barbá (B68)

11 goals
 Jan Allan Müller (Sumba/VB)

10 goals
 Kurt Mørkøre (B68)
 Eli Hentze (B71)
 Magni Jarnskor (GÍ)

9 goals
 Torbjørn Jensen (B71)

8 goals
 Sigfríður Clementsen (HB)
 Uni Arge (HB)
 Olgar Danielsen (KÍ)

1. deild seasons
Faroe
Faroe
1